Gold Head Branch State Park, a Florida State Park, is just shy of 2400 acres (8 km²) of rolling sandhills, marshes, ravines, lakes and scrub located midway between Gainesville and Jacksonville, six miles (10 km) north of Keystone Heights on SR 21. Gold Head is one of the earliest state parks in Florida. Some of its amenities, including cabins, were originally constructed by the Civilian Conservation Corps (CCC) in the 1930s.  The park was listed on the National Register of Historic Places in 2020.

Biology
Among the wildlife of the park are fox squirrels, southeastern kestrels, red-tailed hawks, bald eagles, wild turkeys, and gopher tortoises. The park also has pocket gopher, fox, white-tailed deer and variety of water and wading birds. The park has a diversity of wild flowers. Among them are blazing star, goldenrod, and lopsided Indian grass.

Recreational activities
Activities include fishing, horseback riding, canoeing, swimming, hiking and wildlife viewing. Amenities include full facility camping, lakeside cabins, a picnic area overlooking Little Lake Johnson, and a beach on the lake. The park also has four marked hiking trails and a seven-mile (11 km) equestrian trail.

Hours
Florida state parks are open between 8 a.m. and sundown every day of the year (including holidays).

References

External links

 Mike Roess Gold Head Branch State Park at Florida State Parks
 Gold Head Branch State Park at State Parks
 Gold Head Branch State Park at Absolutely Florida
 Gold Head Branch State Park at Wildernet

Parks in Clay County, Florida
State parks of Florida
Protected areas established in 1935
Civilian Conservation Corps in Florida
National Register of Historic Places in Clay County, Florida
National Park Service rustic in Florida